Rolv Helge Wesenlund (17 September 1936 – 18 August 2013) was a Norwegian comedian, singer, clarinetist, writer and actor.

Biography
Wesenlund was most known for having portrayed the title character in the movies Bør Børson, Bør Børson II, and the TV series Fleksnes Fataliteter, a popular Scandinavian sitcom, with a huge number of fans in Sweden, Denmark as well as Norway. The show was mainly an adaption of the British series Hancock's Half Hour.
Wesenlund had his stage debut in 1964; his movie debut in 1966; and his TV debut in 1968, with the TV series Og takk for det. On this show and several others, he worked with Gunnar Haugan and Harald Heide-Steen Jr. For several years, he hosted the talk show Wesenstund.
Wesenlund wrote several books, directed theatrical plays, and was active in several movements to promote senior citizens' causes. Wesenlund was appointed a Knight First Class of the Royal Norwegian Order of St. Olav —and was popular in Denmark and Sweden as well as in his home country.

Bibliography
2001 Spis i det gamle Roma: Trastevere (with Per Pallesen and Claus Seidel (illustrations)
2000 Dett var dett! : Om og med Rolv Wesenlund (biography cowritten with Øyvind Thorsen)
1985 Du verden: fortellinger bakvaskelser stiler og skrivelser 1983–1985
1982 Livet er ikke bare en lek, det er også en dans på roser

Filmography
2002, 1988, 1982, 1981, 1976, 1974, 1972 Fleksnes Fataliteter
1997 Og takk for det - Wesensteen
1994 Fredrikssons fabrikk - The Movie, «Nilsen»
1992 Ute av drift, «Reidar Willien»
1990 Camping
1985 Deilig er fjorden, «Terje Svahberg»
1982 Henrys bakværelse, «Kunde 1»
1982 Olsenbandens aller siste kupp, «Inspektøren»
1981 Den grønne heisen, «Fredrik Borkmann»
1981 Göta Kanal - eller hvem dro ut proppen? (orig. Göta Kanal - eller vem drog ur proppen?), «Nordmannen Ole»
1981 Seks barn på flukt (orig. Barna från Blåsjöfjället), «Norsk sjåfør»
1978 Firmaskogturen (orig. Firmaskovturen)
1978 Picassos eventyr (orig. Picassos äventyr...tusen kärleksfulla lögner)
1976 Bør Børson II, «Bør Børson»
1974 Bør Børson jr., «Bør Børson jr.»
1974 Den siste Fleksnes, «Marve Fleksnes»
1974 Ungen «Gjendøperen»
1972 Kjære Husmor
1972 Ture Sventon - Privatdetektiv, «Muhammed»
1972 Skärgårdsflirt, «Karl-Johan in Swedish TV-play,1972 by Gideon Wahlberg»
1972 Norske byggeklosser, multiple roles
1970 Douglas, «Douglas»
1969 Tipp topp - Husmorfilmen høsten 1969
1968 Mannen som ikke kunne le
1967 Jungelboka (orig. The Jungle Book)
1967 Liv
1966 How I Became an Art Collector Without Really Trying
1966 Hurra for Andersens!, «Hermansen»

References

External links

Livet er godt — og det må vi si fra om! — interview in the Norwegian magazine «Vi over 60»
Biography about his role as H.C. Andersen—ambassador

1936 births
2013 deaths
Norwegian male comedians
Leonard Statuette winners
Norwegian male stage actors
Norwegian male film actors
Norwegian male television actors